Coptops illicita is a species of beetle in the family Cerambycidae. It was described by Francis Polkinghorne Pascoe in 1865. It is known from Indonesia and the Philippines.

Subspecies
 Coptops illicita auguralis Pascoe, 1865
 Coptops illicita illicita Pascoe, 1865
 Coptops illicita rosacea Breuning, 1980 inq.
 Coptops illicita tabida Pascoe, 1865

References

illicita
Beetles described in 1865